Marktkirche ("Market Church", i. e. church on the market square) is the name of numerous churches in Germany:

Marktkirche, Hanover
Marktkirche, Wiesbaden
Marktkirche Unser Lieben Frauen, Halle, Saxony-Anhalt